The 2009–10 Green Bay Phoenix men's basketball team represents the University of Wisconsin–Green Bay in the 2009–10 NCAA Division I men's basketball season. Their head coach was Tod Kowalczyk. The Phoenix played their home games at the Resch Center and were members of the Horizon League. They finished the season 23–13, 11–7 in Horizon League play, losing in the second round of the 2010 Horizon League men's basketball tournament to Detroit and losing in the second round of the 2010 CBI tournament to Saint Louis.

Roster

Schedule and results
Source

|-
!colspan=12 style=| Exhibition

|-
!colspan=12 style=|Regular season

|-
!colspan=9 style=|Horizon League tournament

|-
!colspan=9 style=|CBI

References

 UW-Green Bay Sports Reference

Green Bay Phoenix men's basketball seasons
Green Bay
Green Bay
Green Bay Phoenix men's basket
Green Bay Phoenix men's basket